Actinotignum is a bacterial genus in the family Actinomycetaceae.

See also
 Bacterial taxonomy
 Microbiology

References 

Bacteria genera
Actinomycetales